This is a list of members of the Tasmanian Legislative Council between 1981 and 1987. Terms of the Legislative Council did not coincide with Legislative Assembly elections, and members served six year terms, with a number of members facing election each year.

Elections

Members

Notes

  In 1982, the members for Tamar and Meander were appointed to each other's seats following a redistribution.
  On 14 January 1986, Peter Hodgman, the member for Huon, resigned to run for a Franklin seat at the 8 February 1986 elections to the House of Assembly. Athol Meyer won the resulting by-election on 12 April 1986.
  On 15 January 1986, Brian Miller, the Labor member for Newdegate, also resigned to contest the Assembly election, but was unsuccessful. Ross Ginn won the resulting by-election on 12 April 1986.

Sources
 
 Parliament of Tasmania (2006). The Parliament of Tasmania from 1856

Members of Tasmanian parliaments by term
20th-century Australian politicians